The Whakatane Astronomical Society is a voluntary, non-profit society for people interested in amateur astronomy in the Whakatane District of New Zealand. The society was founded in September 1960, and maintains a small observatory in Whakatane, which has been operating continuously since 1964. The society is affiliated with the Royal Astronomical Society of New Zealand.

The Society's main fund raising activity is the running of observing nights on Tuesday and Friday evenings, where members of the public pay a small fee to view the sky using one or more of the society's telescopes at the observatory, under the guidance of a society member. Similar evenings can also be run for larger/school groups, with prior arrangement.

Equipment 
The Society's observatory houses three main telescopes:
 A 350mm Celestron Schmidt-Cassegrain
 A 250mm Meade Instruments Schmidt-Cassegrain with GoTo Control
 A custom built 150mm refractor, equipped with a solar filter

See also
 List of astronomical societies
 List of astronomical observatories

References

External links 
 Sky of Plenty (Whakatane Astronomical Society Homepage)
 Listing on Whakatane.info

Astronomical observatories in New Zealand
Whakatāne